Hora Um da Notícia, also known as simply Hora Um, is an early morning two hour-long news program aired by the Brazilian television broadcaster Rede Globo, which debuted on December 1, 2014, replacing the daily edition of the Globo Rural as well as the educational program Telecurso. Since September 9, 2019, it is presented by Roberto Kovalick.

It comes with the proposal to bring the major news in the early morning and the 1st morning news for a Brazilian who wakes increasingly earlier. The weather forecast will be anchored by Maria Julia Coutinho and will have correspondents in Lisbon, London, Rome, Jerusalem and Tokyo.

The news also appears to recover its leadership of the time, which was held by SBT. With the debut of this program, there is 4 hours of straight journalism and 9 hours of live programming.

On September 3, 2019, the main presenter Monalisa Perrone left both the news program and Rede Globo as she has signed to host an upcoming prime-time news program on CNN Brazil. It was also announced that journalist Roberto Kovalick would be replacing her as presenter starting from September 9.

Main Presenters 
 Roberto Kovalick (September 9, 2019 – present)
 Ana Paula Campos, César Menezes e Bruno Tavares (Relief presenters)

 Weather forecast
 Marcelo Pereira
 Tiago Scheuer, Cinthia Toledo (Relief presenter)

 Sports block
 Alessandro Jodar
 Renato Cury (Relief presenter)

Former presenters
 Monalisa Perrone (December 1, 2014 – September 3, 2019)

References

Rede Globo original programming
Brazilian television news shows
2014 Brazilian television series debuts
2010s Brazilian television series
2020s Brazilian television series
Portuguese-language television shows